There are five national parks in El Salvador.

List of national parks 
El Boqueron National Park (Crater del Volcán de San Salvador National Park)
San Diego and San Felipe Las Barras National Park
El Imposible National Park
Montecristo National Park 
Los Volcanes National Park (Cerro Verde National Park)

Other protected areas
(partial list)
 San Isidro Natural Monument
 Volcán de San Miguel Protected Area
 Isla Martin Pérez Protected Area
 Isla Tasajera Protected Area
 Isla Conchaguita Protected Area
 Isla Meanguera Protected Area
 Isla Zacatillo Protected Area
 Walter Tilo Deininger Park
 Laguna de Las Ninfas Protected Area

References 

 
El Salvador
National parks